Athouli is a village located in the sub-district of Phagwara, District Kapurthala, East Punjab, India.

Athouli contains 246 households and has a population of 1,331 people of which 703 are males and 703 are females.

Athouli is home to the Guru Nanak Institute of Health Sciences and Research ("GNI") which is a nursing institute providing nursing education to students in Punjab.  GNI is partnered with Bellingham Technical College based in Bellingham, Washington, USA, for the provision of healthcare education.

References 

Villages in Kapurthala district